Ottran is a 2003 Indian Tamil-language spy thriller film starring Arjun, Simran, Manorama, Vadivelu, Tejashree, Sarath Babu and directed by Ilankannan. The score and soundtrack was composed by Pravin Mani.

Plot 
Karthik is an upright RAW agent who is on the trail of an anti-national group who are out to destabilise the country. He lives in a palatial house with his mother in New Delhi. The police in Chennai nab Ali, a terrorist behind the Parliament and temple attack. Sudha and Shiva are the children of Manikkavel IPS, IG-Prisons, police officer who is in charge of bringing Ali to court.

Now Ali's people kidnap Sudha and blackmail her brother to bring home three terrorists and give them shelter. So he is forced to introduce them as his friends and keep them in his father's official bungalow.

Karthik saves Sudha from the terrorist and comes to Chennai to uncover the ISI plan to rescue Ali and create communal tension in the state. How Karthik emerges winner single-handedly forms the rest of this predictable yarn.

Cast 

Arjun as Karthik, a RAW agent
Simran as Sudha
Sarath Babu as Manikkavel IPS, IG-Prisons
Vadivelu as Maadasaamy
Manorama as Karthik's mother
Ambika as Sudha's mother
Shyam Ganesh as Shiva, Sudha's brother
Gaurav Chopra as Ghazi baba
Hari Nair as Terrorist
Riyaz Khan as Beer Mohammed
Ajay Rathnam as SP Saran IPS
Pyramid Natarajan as Kumara Saamy
Chitti Babu as Marriage Broker
Tejashree as Azhagi
Mahanadi Shankar
Anu Mohan
Singamuthu
Rajeev as Commissioner Rajasekhar IPS
Sathya Prakash
Hemanth Ravan
Dharmesh
Vimal Raj as Jail Superintendent
Chitra
Vishal
Satheesh
Ambareesh
Baby Rani

Production 
After the success of Arjun-directed Ezhumalai, the Arjun-Simran pair come together in yet another film titled Ottran. Directing the film is first-timer Ilankannan, who had apprenticed with director Shanker. Arjun plays a secret agent in the film, which gives him scope for enough of action scenes. Shooting commenced in Chennai in a forty-day schedule.

Soundtrack 

These 6 songs in Ottran are composed by Pravin Mani.

"Yeh Thiththippey" – Karthik, Suchitra
"Oru Paarvai" – Srinivas, Sujatha
"Chinna Veeda" – Manikka Vinayagam, Srilekha Parthasarathy
"Kitchu Kitchu" – Shankar Mahadevan, Lavanya
"Uttalangadi" – Manikka Vinayagam
"En Kanave" – Srinivas, Sujatha

Critical reception 
Malathi Rangarajan of The Hindu wrote, "first half of the film is the screenplay that allows no room for sluggishness or dampeners. The film moves on at breakneck speed and by the time you take a breather it's intermission".

References 

2003 films
2000s Tamil-language films
Films about the Research and Analysis Wing
2003 directorial debut films
Indian spy thriller films